Marcia Gardner is an American politician who served as a member of the Vermont House of Representatives for the Chittenden 1 district from 2017 to 2021.

References

Living people
University of Vermont alumni
Saint Michael's College alumni
21st-century American politicians
21st-century American women politicians
Democratic Party members of the Vermont House of Representatives
Women state legislators in Vermont
Year of birth missing (living people)